Chikara Miyake  is a Japanese mixed martial artist. He competed in the Lightweight division.

Mixed martial arts record

|-
| Loss
| align=center| 1-2-1
| Takumi Nakayama
| Decision (unanimous)
| Shooto: Gig West 1
| 
| align=center| 2
| align=center| 5:00
| Osaka, Japan
| 
|-
| Loss
| align=center| 1-1-1
| Kohei Yasumi
| Decision (unanimous)
| Shooto: R.E.A.D. 6
| 
| align=center| 2
| align=center| 5:00
| Tokyo, Japan
| 
|-
| Win
| align=center| 1-0-1
| Koichi Tanaka
| Submission (rear naked choke)
| Shooto: Renaxis 5
| 
| align=center| 1
| align=center| 2:16
| Kadoma, Osaka, Japan
| 
|-
| Draw
| align=center| 0-0-1
| Jinzaburo Yonezawa
| Draw
| Shooto: Shooter's Soul
| 
| align=center| 2
| align=center| 5:00
| Setagaya, Tokyo, Japan
|

See also
List of male mixed martial artists

References

Japanese male mixed martial artists
Lightweight mixed martial artists
Living people
Year of birth missing (living people)